Living is a 2022 British drama film directed by Oliver Hermanus from a screenplay by Kazuo Ishiguro, adapted from the 1952 Japanese film Ikiru directed by Akira Kurosawa, which in turn was inspired by the 1886 Russian novella The Death of Ivan Ilyich by Leo Tolstoy. Set in 1953 London, it depicts a bureaucrat in the county Public Works department (played by Bill Nighy) facing a fatal illness.

Living had its world premiere at the 2022 Sundance Film Festival on 21 January 2022, and was released in the United Kingdom on 4 November 2022, by Lionsgate. The film received positive reviews, with Nighy's performance receiving particular acclaim, and at the 95th Academy Awards was nominated for Best Actor (Nighy) and Best Adapted Screenplay.

Plot 
Rodney Williams is a senior London County Council bureaucrat in 1953 London. He sits at his desk surrounded by high piles of paperwork, and seems uninspired. A group of women, led by Mrs Smith (Lia Williams), petition the council to have a World War II bomb site redeveloped into a children’s playground. They are sent with their petition from department to department but to no avail. Mr Williams receives the petition and adds it to his pile of paperwork, making clear to his colleagues his intention to take no further action.

When Mr Williams receives a terminal cancer diagnosis he neglects to tell his son Michael and daughter-in-law, Fiona, instead opting to withdraw half of his life savings, purchase a lethal amount of sleeping medicine, and commit suicide in a seaside resort town. Finding himself unable to go through with it, he gives the sleeping medicine to Mr. Sutherland, an insomniac writer he meets in a restaurant. Moved by Williams' story, Sutherland takes him for a night on the town, where Williams replaces his traditional bowler hat with a fedora. In a pub, he sings "The Rowan Tree," a Scottish folk song from his childhood. 

Returning to London but not to work, Williams runs into Miss Harris, a former colleague who took up a position at a Lyon's Corner House restaurant while he was away. Williams' nosy neighbor spots the pair having lunch and tells Fiona, who demands Michael speak to his father about the potential scandal. Meanwhile, Williams attempts to tell Michael about his diagnosis, but neither find themselves able to bring up what they need to talk about. 

As Williams' condition worsens, he attempts to spend more time with Harris, whose youthful vigor he envies and would like to regain before he dies. Realizing the best way to spend his remaining time is to do some good, Williams rallies his office to construct the children's playground. Though he is able to push the process through by standing up to his colleagues and superiors, he dies shortly after construction is finished. At his funeral, well-attended by the people he has helped, Michael guesses to Harris that Williams told her about his diagnosis but not him. 

Inspired by Williams' actions, his former colleagues pledge to uphold his example, but soon revert to their old ways. Mr. Wakeling, who joined the office shortly before Williams' diagnosis, reads a letter left for him by Williams instructing him to remember the playground when he gets discouraged. Visiting the playground, Wakeling meets a police officer who tells him that he saw Williams there shortly before he died, rocking in the swing in the snow and singing "The Rowan Tree." The constable feels guilty that he let Williams sit in the cold in his condition. Wakeling consoles the officer, saying that Williams was likely happier in that moment than he had been for a very long time.

Cast

Production
In October 2020, the project was announced with Nobel Prize-winning novelist Ishiguro as screenwriter, and Nighy and Wood attached to star. In December 2020, Lionsgate acquired the UK distribution rights. In June 2021, principal photography began in the UK, Sharp and Burke were announced to have joined the film, and the first image from the film was released. It was also announced that Toho, the distributor of the original film, had acquired the rights for Japan. London's County Hall provided the backdrop for the film; in addition, the film was co-financed through the County Hall Arts charity.

Release
In January 2022, the film premiered at the 2022 Sundance Film Festival, where it was announced that Sony Pictures Classics had acquired the distribution rights in North America, Latin America, India, Scandinavia, Eastern Europe, Germany, South Africa, Southeast Asia and airlines worldwide. Living screened at the BFI London Film Festival in October 2022 and at the TCL Chinese Theatre as part of the 2022 AFI Fest on 6 November 2022. The film was released theatrically in the United Kingdom on 4 November 2022, and had a limited theatrical release in the United States on 23 December 2022.

Reception

On the review aggregator website Rotten Tomatoes, the film has an approval rating of 96% based on 189 reviews, with an average rating of 8/10. The site's critics consensus reads: "Living sets a high bar for itself in setting out to remake a Kurosawa classic—and director Oliver Hermanus and star Bill Nighy clear it in triumphant fashion." On Metacritic, it holds a weighted average score of 81 out of 100, based on 40 critics, indicating "universal acclaim".

Accolades

References

External links
 
 Official screenplay

2020s British films
2020s English-language films
2022 independent films
British drama films
British Film Institute films
Film4 Productions films
Films directed by Oliver Hermanus
Films shot in London
Films set in 1953
Films set in London
Films with screenplays by Kazuo Ishiguro
Lionsgate films
Number 9 Films films
Remakes of Japanese films
Sony Pictures Classics films